Stony Hill Vineyard is located south of the Bothe-Napa Valley State Park in the northern reaches of the city of Saint Helena, California. The vineyard is a family-owned business which remained under family control after the death of the founders in 1977. The vineyard's business model focuses on mail order sales direct to individuals in California and indirectly to individuals in other states of the United States, as well as sales to fine-dining restaurants in major metropolitan areas in the United States.

History 
In 1943 San Francisco advertising executive Fred McCrea and his wife Eleanor bought  of homestead land on the west slope of the Napa Valley north of St. Helena. The name Stony Hill Vineyard evolved when they cultivated their first Chardonnay fields in 1947, followed shortly by plantings of Pinot blanc, White Riesling, Gewurztraminer and Semillon.  Their first harvest was in 1952, and they sold their first Chardonnay in 1954.
Winemaker Mike Chelini came to Stony Hill in 1972, first as vineyard foreman and then as winemaker when Fred died in 1977.  Since then Mike has overseen both vineyard and winery operations, supervising six full-time, year-round employees who hand tend the vines and hand pick the grapes.  Recently Mike incorporated Napa County’s Fish Friendly Farming and Napa Green practices in the vineyards.
Peter and Willinda McCrea, the founders’ son and daughter-in-law, inherited Stony Hill in 1991 when Eleanor died and continue to run the business today. 
The winery was one of the first in California to achieve a commercial status that eventually came to be called "cult." Wineries in this group enjoyed demand that they could not supply, leaving the wines especially sought-after at all levels of the market. Two decisions seem to have made this possible: first, the commercial decision not to pursue wine sales through normal wholesale channels; second, the winemaking decision to maintain a rigorous commitment to a simple, direct and classical expression of a singular vineyard site, and a complete disregard for changing fashions in winemaking or consumer appeal. The McCreas pioneered the now common model of a winery's direct relationship to its final consumers through a mailing list, and, because of the great demand, eventually created a waiting list for their wines. This model was rare when they began to cultivate it but is widespread and even "industry standard" now. 
The winery's cult status might have faded somewhat as trophy wines based on Cabernet Sauvignon, not Chardonnay, took the fore in the 1990s and early 2000s, but now, under the effect of a pendulum swing in sommeliers' and journalists' tastes, the winery has returned to a cult status, with fervent demand from new generations of consumers.

In August 2018, Stony Hill Vineyard announced that it was being acquired by Long Meadow Ranch in a transaction where the McCrea family retained a small equity interest in Long Meadow Ranch as part of the deal. Stony hill President Sarah McCrea said in a statement, "We consider this as less of a traditional sale and more of an integration of two family businesses to make a stronger whole.”

In 2020, Stony Hill was acquired by Gaylon Lawrence Jr. and Carlton McCoy Jr.. Jamie Motley was appointed as winemaker.

References

External links

Images 

Wineries in Napa Valley
Companies based in Napa County, California
1952 establishments in California
St. Helena, California
American companies established in 1952
Food and drink companies established in 1952